The Muslim Leadership Initiative, or MLI, is an educational program of the Shalom Hartman Institute of North America. The program invites North American Muslim leaders to explore how Jews understand Judaism, Israel and North American Jewish identity through a Zionist lens.

The MLI program is a thirteen-month fellowship consisting of academic study, site visits in Israel and the occupied Palestinian territories, ongoing learning opportunities in the United States, and public-facing programs in the United States and Canada. While the MLI program concentrates on the Jewish experience in and through Israel, participants also engage Palestinian leaders, communities and institutions from Israel and the West Bank. The stated aim of the program is the improvement of relationships between North American Jewish and Muslim communities. However, citing its ties to the Shalom Hartman Institute, critics argue that the ultimate aim is to undermine Muslim solidarity with Palestine.

Origins and Objectives 
MLI is overseen by the Shalom Hartman Institute of North America, and co-directed by Imam Abdullah Antepli, Public Policy Professor at Duke University, and Yossi Klein Halevi, a Senior Fellow at the Shalom Hartman Institute in Jerusalem. The two conceived of the MLI program over several years, and deliberately modeled the program, including class structure and academic themes, on existing Rabbinic and Christian leadership models already in place at the Shalom Hartman Institute. Their stated objective in designing the MLI program was to reach those large segments of mainstream North American Muslim and Jewish communities between which there are few, if any, substantive relationships; their objectives for the program furthermore indicated the hope that the MLI program would educate North American Muslims about Judaism, Zionism and Israel, but that an outcome of the program would be reciprocal. While the MLI program itself is a one-directional educational experience, public-facing programs have presented various opportunities for North American Jews to learn about North American Muslim communities and Islam.

Participants and Public Programs 
Alumni of the MLI program include Wajahat Ali, playwright, frequent television commentator and contributing op-ed columnist for The New York Times, Rabia Chaudry, attorney and author of the New York Times bestseller, “Adnan’s Story,” and Haroon Moghul, the Fellow in Jewish-Muslim Relations at the Shalom Hartman Institute. Other participants have written about their experience in a special series for Tablet magazine, or have been otherwise published at Tablet.

The program has graduated over fifty participants, with another fifty currently in their thirteen-month fellowships. Participants are selected for their commitment to mainstream Muslim communities, as well as their reflection of the ethnic and racial, professional, religious and geographic diversity of North American Islam. Critics of the program argue that Muslims who participating in the [Muslim Leadership Initiative] program are promoting the dangerous narrative that makes Judaism and Zionism one and the same – despite protest against this conflation by some in the Jewish community.

Criticism 

Critics have objected strongly to Muslim participation in a program run by the Shalom Hartman Institute, which receives funding from groups in the United States that have been accused of otherwise supporting Islamophobic activities. The Shalom Hartman Institution is funded by organizations like the Russell Berrie Foundation, which was named in  the 2011 Center for American Progress report “Fear, Inc.: The Roots of the Islamophobia Network in America” as one of the top seven donors to anti-Muslim hate groups in the United States.

Other critics of the program, such as Palestinian activist Ali Abunimah, argue that by running counter to the objectives of the Boycott, Divestment and Sanctions (BDS) movement, the MLI program undermines solidarity with Palestine. Further, some critics have argued that the program  “faithwashes” the occupation of Palestine, transforming what is primarily a political dispute into an interfaith exercise. According to them, "faith-washing" reframes Israel's occupation of Palestine into a centuries-long religious conflict between Jews and Muslims, erasing Israel's  oppression of the Palestinian people.

The MLI program has also been supported and praised. In response to critics within the North American Muslim community, one participant in the program, Haroon Moghul, noted that MLI incorporates site visits to the West Bank, invites Palestinian leaders to address participants to further dialogue, is itself intended to challenge Islamophobia (and anti-Semitism) and does not demand advocacy of any political position, nor repudiation of any.

David Horovitz of The Times of Israel called MLI a "high-risk, taboo-shattering initiative — a vital step, they hope, toward Muslim-Jewish healing in America and beyond." Gary Rosenblatt of The Jewish Week described MLI as "a model exercise in expressing honest, often painful, views with more than just civility. The MLI members and the handful of Hartman faculty were able to convey empathy and personal affection for each other without standing down an inch from their fervent beliefs."

References

2013 establishments in Israel
Islamic and Jewish interfaith dialogue
Education in Israel